Leonid Leonidovich Markevich (born 15 August 1973) is a former Russian professional football player.

Club career
He made his debut in the Russian Premier League in 1993 for PFC CSKA Moscow.

Honours
 Russian Cup finalist: 1994.

References

1973 births
People from Dolgoprudny
Living people
Russian footballers
PFC CSKA Moscow players
FC Salyut Belgorod players
FC Sokol Saratov players
Russian Premier League players
FC Metallurg Lipetsk players
Association football midfielders
Sportspeople from Moscow Oblast